Ischgl is a town in the Paznaun valley in the Austrian state of Tyrol. Its ski resort is connected with that of Samnaun across the border in Switzerland to form one of the largest in the Alps. Ischgl was a major hotspot in 2020 of the COVID-19 pandemic in Europe.

Ski resort

Ischgl is located on the Austrian side of one of the world's largest ski areas. Its  (length includes the pistes in Samnaun, Switzerland) of groomed pistes are served by over 45 mechanical lifts including cable cars, gondolas, detachable chair lifts and some T-bars. Three ropeways give access to the ski area from the village: the Pardatschgratbahn, the Fimbabahn & the Silvrettabahn. Only the Fimbabahn and the Silvrettabahn have middle stations. 

Many of the lifts converge at Idalp, where there is a restaurant. The area above Idalp offers wide, easy pistes and a snow park. Other parts of the Ischgl area, towards Höllboden and Paznauner Thaya, offer many red runs and some more challenging blacks. The steepest run in the resort is a black run with a gradient of 70%, located in the Höllboden bowl, and accessed by the "Lange Wand" chair lift. Paznauner Thaya offers many red runs suitable for intermediate-level skiers.

COVID-19 pandemic hotspot

Ischgl was identified as a major hotspot of the COVID-19 pandemic in Europe. Six hundred infections in Austria and up to 1,200 infections in Germany and the Nordic countries were traced back to the ski resort, starting from Iceland on 1 March 2020, with transmissions occurring from late February 2020. A significant portion of the cases were further traced to the Kitzloch après-ski bar at the resort, where sharing of whistles were likely conduits of contagion. Even as health authorities in other countries began issuing warnings against travel to Ischgl, the resort remained open, with Tyrolean authorities playing down the risks. The bar was eventually closed on 10 March and the whole town quarantined from 13 March until 22 April 2020.

Out of the 1600 inhabitants of Ischgl, two persons died. Nine were treated in hospital, one in an intensive care unit. In April 2020 antibodies were found in 51.4% of the population, in November 2020 it was still 45.4%.

Gallery

External links

Official Ischgl website
Panoramic photo of Ischgl resort centre

References

Ski areas and resorts in Austria
Tourist attractions in Tyrol (state)
Cities and towns in Landeck District
Verwall Alps
Silvretta Alps